Neocollyris smaragdina is a species of ground beetle in the genus Neocollyris in the family Carabidae. It was described by Horn in 1894.

N. smaragdina was depicted in the 1912 book "Coleoptera: General Introduction and Cicindelidae and Paussidae" by entomologist William Weekes Fowler and described as "very closely allied to N. saphyrina" but on average larger, and having a more narrow pronotum.

References

Smaragdina, Neocollyris
Beetles described in 1894